Atna Peak is a mountain in British Columbia, Canada, located  northwest of Howson Peak and  southeast of Morice Lake.

References

Two-thousanders of British Columbia
Range 4 Coast Land District